Ralph Justice was a member of the House of Burgesses in 1754 and the representative of Accomack County.

References

Year of birth missing
Year of death missing
House of Burgesses members